Surprise is a low-budget 2015 Chinese fantasy comedy film directed by Show Joy. It is based on a Youku web series of the same name by Show Joy but with a different content. It had wide previews on December 12 and 13 and was released on December 18, 2015.

Plot 
The movie tells the story of Wang Dachui (Bai Ke), a youth blessed with some magic powers who often dreams of being the chief demon of the Stone Ox Village. One day, he meets with a surprise, which happens to be the arrival of the Tang Sanzang (Chen Bolin) and his three disciples, and his life meets with an unexpected change.

As for Tang Sanzang and his three disciples, while they find Wang Dachui boring beyond explanation, a magical story of love and killing is about to unravel for both parties.

Cast
 Bai Ke as Wang Dachui, the main protagonist of the movie.
 Yang Zishan as Su Xiaomei, Wang Dachui's love interest.
 Chen Bolin as Tang Sanzang
 Liu Xunzimo as Sun Wukong
 Mike Pirath Nitipaisankul as Zhu Bajie
 Show Joy as Sha Wujing
 Ma Tianyu as Murong Bai, Wang Dachui's love rival and a resident in the Stone Ox village.
 Eric Tsang as the Earth God (cameo)

Reception
The film grossed  from previews on 12–13 December 2015. It grossed  on its opening weekend.

References

External links
 

2015 films
Chinese fantasy comedy films
Films based on television series
Polybona Films films
Tianjin Maoyan Media films
2010s fantasy comedy films
2015 comedy films
2010s Mandarin-language films